Dimitris "Mimis" Domazos (born 22 January 1942) is a Greek former professional footballer who played as an attacking midfielder. His nickname was "The General".

Domazos is considered to be one of the best footballers that Greece has ever produced. He was famed for his dribbling ability, his creative playstyle, especially his through balls of pinpoint accuracy and his leadership skills. He was the Panathinaikos captain for over 15 years. The IFFHS chose him in the best XI of all time of Greek football in 2021.

Club career

Early career
Domazos was born on 22 January 1942 in Ampelokipoi, and grew up next to the Leoforos Alexandras Stadium. His father was a health worker originally from Samos and his mother a nurse of Asia Minor origin. From a young age he played ball in the fields of the area and at the age of 13 he took out a sport's card for the Amyna Ampelokipoi in 1953, declaring a false age in order to be able to compete. Soon his fame began to spread and he attracted the interest of Panathinaikos. In 1958, the then coach of the "greens", Svetislav Glišović, saw him play and impressed by his moves on the pitch, recommended his acquisition.

Panathinaikos
Domazos made his unofficial debut with Panathinaikos in a friendly match against AEK Athens for the Christmas Cup, which was held on December 26, 1958 and ended in a 2–0 defeat. He played as a right winger and impressed spectators and experts of the sport with his football skills. In the summer of 1959, he officially joined Panathinaikos at the age of 17 "for a suit and an orange juice", as he had stated. Despite his small stature, Domazos gradually managed to impose himself on the players of that era. His terrific passing, incredible assists and leadership earned him the respect of teammates and opponents, as well as the admiration of the fans. Most of the team's attacks went through his feet. Like a "maestro", with his clever play he orchestrated an entire team. Soon, the people of Panathinaikos gave him the nickname "The General", which followed him throughout his football career. In his first three seasons, he won the same number of championships. He scored in the game that secured the last one in 4 June 1961 in a 3–3 draw against Panionios. On 26 November 1961 Mimis Domazos scored 4 goals in the 5–2 away win against Proodeftiki and became the first player of the club to score a four goals in an official match. He became the captain of the "greens" for almost 15 years. He formed a great attacking duo with his teammate and best friend, Antonis Antoniadis. In the Cup final in 1969 he scored a free kick against Olympiacos and after the 1–1 at the extra time, at a flip of a coin, he chose correctly and his team was awarded the title. He led Panathinaikos, under Ferenc Puskás, to the Final of the European Cup at Wembley Stadium against Ajax on June 2, 1971 where they lost 2–0. In December of the same year, he also participated in the 2-legged final of the Intercontinental Cup against Nacional where they lost 3–2 on aggregate. He was Ballon d'Or nominee in 1969 and 1971. Another remarkable moment of his career was in 1977 where Panathinaikos won the Balkans Cup, even though he did not compete in the double final against Slavia Sofia. On March 17 1974, in a decisive derby against Olympiacos, Domazos scored a stunning bicycle kick and equalized in the final 1–1. Domazos won at Panathinaikos an impressive 9 Championships, 3 Cups and 1 Balkan Cup, including 2 domestic doubles in 1969 and 1977. As a player with a strong personality on and off the field, he did not hesitate to clash with anyone within the team, as in 1978 the conflict with the administrative agent Antonis Mantzavelakis occurred. So after 498 games in Panathinaikos, 134 goals and 19 years in the team, he parted ways with the "greens", while he was called a "finished player".

AEK Athens
The owner of AEK Athens, Loukas Barlos did not miss the golden opportunity and immediately approached Domazos. Barlos, before signing him, called the other legend of the Greek football and captain of the club, Mimis Papaioannou to his office to get the required "approval" for the huge transfer. Papaioannou didn't think twice about it and agreed. Domazos was what the club was missing to orchestrate the attack of Bajević-Mavros. With all those stars gathered in the same roster the club played amazing football, while he also had the chance to work again under his former coach, Puskás. He had an amazing first season with 29 appearances and 5 goals and proved wrong the people who called him "finished", as in AEK he was a model of professionalism. He scored his first goals in a brace against PAOK, in 10 September 1978. In 8 April 1979 he faced his former club, in a 1–0 win and before the end of the first half, there was a fierce fight between the players, after a foul of Panathinakos and after a beating between the players as well as a red card for each side, Panathinakos player and former teammate, Álvarez spoke out against Domazos, accusing him of spitting him while threatening, in which the "general" responded the following day accepting the charges and challenging him to a fight. At AEK he won yet another league title and despite his advanced age, offered to renew his contract for another year. In the January of the following season, as he realized the affection of his age to his body and after the call of the new Panathinaikos' president Yiorgos Vardinogiannis, he requested an audition from Barlos. Domazos told him he wanted to return to his beloved Panathinakos to finish his career and Barlos immediately accepted, respecting his wish.

Retirement
Domazos dressed in green again making his big return to the club he was cherished. He may not have scored in the 12 matches he played in, but he proved that no matter how many years had passed, he still had plenty of mental and physical strength, with his leading presence in the winning derby against Olympiacos at home, on 13 January of 1980. Ηe ended his glorious career in the summer of 1980 with a record of 536 appearances and 139 goals.

International career
Domazos made his debut with Greece on 2 December 1959 against Denmark in a 3–1 defeat at Leoforos. His last match was on 11 November 1980, at the same stadium in a friendly match against Australia, in a 3–3 draw, in which he was honored for his many years of contribution to the national team and the Greek football in general. In this specific match he scored his last goal, which makes him the oldest player to ever score for Greece, since in less than three months he would have turned 39. 
He was the National team captain during these years. In total he was capped 50 times and scored four goals.

Personal life
Domazos was married to the late Vicky Moscholiou, a popular singer from 1967 to 1978. The couple had two daughters. Since retirement he has been a businessman and often writes opinion columns for Greek sports newspapers. He owns a chain of five-a-side football stadiums. His nephew, Christos Domazos, currently plays in Rethymno football club. Domazos was one of the final torchbearers for the Opening Ceremony of the 2004 Athens Olympic Games.

Honours

Panathinaikos
Alpha Ethniki: 1959–60, 1960–61, 1961–62, 1963–64, 1964–65, 1968–69, 1969–70, 1971–72, 1976–77
Greek Cup: 1966–67, 1968–69, 1976–77
Balkans Cup: 1977

AEK Athens
Alpha Ethniki: 1978–79

Records
Most league appearances in Greece, with 536 official matches (502 with Panathinaikos and 34 with AEK Athens).
Longest-active footballer in the history of Greek football, having played for more than 21 years. (1959–1980)
He scored a total of 139 goals in his career (134 with Panathinaikos and 5 with AEK Athens), which were scored: 
124 by shots
7 by free kicks
2 by header
6 by penalty kicks

Statistics

Club
{| class="wikitable" style="text-align:center"
|-
!colspan=5|Club performance
|-
!Season!!Club!!League
!Apps!!Goals
|-
|1960–61
|rowspan=19|Panathinaikos
|rowspan=22|Alpha Ethniki
|29||7
|-
|1960–61
|30||8
|-
|1961–62
|27||16
|-
|1962–63
|28||7
|-
|1963–64
|27||5
|-
|1964–65
|19||5
|-
|1965–66
|30||11
|-
|1966–67
|19||6
|-
|1967–68
|34||9
|-
|1968–69
|32||5
|-
|1969–70
|30||6
|-
|1970–71
|32||20
|-
|1971–72
|30||5
|-
|1972–73
|21||6
|-
|1973–74
|27||7
|-
|1974–75
|29||6
|-
|1975–76
|15||3
|-
|1976–77
|26||2
|-
|1977–78
|5||0
|-
|1978–79
|rowspan=2|AEK Athens
|29||5
|-
|1979–80
|5||0
|-
|1979–80
|Panathinaikos
|12||0
|-
! colspan=3|Career total
!536||139

References

External links

Sport Stories, ert.gr

1942 births
Living people
Footballers from Athens
Greek footballers
Association football midfielders
Panathinaikos F.C. players
AEK Athens F.C. players
Panathinaikos F.C. non-playing staff
Greece international footballers
Super League Greece players